Loulis (born May 10, 1978) is a chimpanzee who has learned to communicate in American Sign Language.

Loulis was named for two caregivers (Louise and Lisa) at the Yerkes Regional Primate Research Center in Atlanta, Georgia, where he was born. After ten months at Yerkes, Loulis was transferred to Oklahoma with Roger Fouts and Washoe, his adoptive mother. In 1980, the family moved to Central Washington University in Ellensburg, Washington. By 1993, the Chimpanzee and Human Communication Institute (CHCI) was built for the family to reside. Loulis's biological mother remained at Yerkes and was used for medical research. In 2013, he moved from the CHCI to the chimpanzee sanctuary of the Fauna Foundation in Canada.

Language abilities 
Washoe and three other chimpanzees (Tatu, Dar, and Moja) were raised as if they were deaf human children and acquired American Sign Language. The chimpanzees regularly use the hand signals to communicate with each other and humans. Loulis is the only chimpanzee in the family who was not cross-fostered (he wasn't raised by humans but rather Washoe and the other chimpanzees).

After eight days with Washoe, Loulis learned his first sign. For the first five years of his life, Loulis's human handlers only used seven signs around him (the signs used were who, which, want, where, name, that, and sign). Loulis was able to acquire what he learned of ASL from Washoe.

The details of this research can be found in Teaching Sign Language to Chimpanzees edited by Allen and Beatrix Gardner.

See also
 Great ape language
 List of individual apes

References

External links 
 Homepage of the Friends of Washoe

Individual chimpanzees
Apes from language studies
Animal intelligence
Primatology
1978 animal births
Sign language